William Holden (1918–1981) was an American film actor.

William Holden may also refer to:
 William Holden (character actor) (1862-1932), American actor
 William Holden (journalist) (1808–1897), writer for South Australian Register and Adelaide Observer
 William Woods Holden (1818–1892), governor of North Carolina
 William Holden (politician) (c.1824–1884), 11th Lieutenant Governor of California
 William Holden (cricketer) (1883-1949), New Zealand cricketer
 William Holden (footballer) (1860–?), English footballer
 Bill Holden (baseball) (1889–1971), American baseball player
 William Curry Holden (1898–1983), American archaeologist, museum curator and historian
 Bill Holden (footballer) (1928–2011), English footballer
 Bill Holden (schoolteacher) (born 1948), American schoolteacher and juvenile diabetes activist
Bill Holden (speedway rider) (1923-2011), British speedway rider.
 Bill Holden (ice hockey) (born 1949), Canadian ice hockey player
 Will Holden (American football) (born 1993), American football offensive tackle
 Will Holden (EastEnders), EastEnders character